The 2009–10 División de Honor Juvenil de Fútbol season was the 24th since its establishment.

Regular season

Group 1

Group 2

Group 3

Group 4

Group 5

Group 6

Group 7

Copa de Campeones

Group A

1st round

2nd round

Group B

Final

Details

See also
2010 Copa del Rey Juvenil

External links
Royal Spanish Football Federation website

2009–10
Juvenil